D'Argens may refer to:
Jean-Baptiste de Boyer, Marquis d'Argens (1704-1771), French philosopher
Alain-Philippe Malagnac d'Argens de Villèle (1950-2000), French aristocrat